Chhoti Si Mulaqat (English: A Brief Interaction) is a 1967 Indian Hindi-language romantic drama film directed by Alo Sarkar starring Uttam Kumar and Vyjayanthimala. It's a remake of 1954 Bengali film Agni Pariksha directed by Agradoot which was an adaption of Asha Purna Devi's novel of the same name.

Plot Summary
Rupa goes on a trip with her grandmother (Pratima Devi) to the village where they meet the ailing Rai Saheb (Badri Prasad), a wealthy old gentleman. Rai Saheb has a grandson, Rajju, whom Rai Saheb and Rupa's grandfather had long ago decided would someday be married to Rupa. Rai Saheb uses emotional blackmail to persuade Rupa's grandmother to agree to an engagement between Rupa and Rajju. But then Rai Saheb has a heart attack and on his deathbed, he insists that Rupa and Rajju be married immediately. Both the children are under-age and do not know nor understand that they have been married. Rupa's mother, back at home discovers the truth and vows to wipe out every single memory of Rupa ever being married. Years laters, Rupa (Vyjayanthimala) has now grown up to be a lovely young lady and is in love with Ashok (Uttam Kumar). Rupa introduces Ashok to her mother, who approves of him, and plans are set to marry them. Then Roopa finds out that she has already been married in child-hood. This creates a conflict in her. Others too find out and all of a sudden Roopa is ostracized. To add menace to the situation, Rupa's cousin Sonia plots to separate Ashok from her. How will Rupa and Ashok deal with this stigma? Will they triumph in their love?
Finally she returns to her in-laws place, only to find that her childhood husband is none other than Ashok.

Cast
Uttam Kumar as Ashok
Vyjayanthimala as Rupa
Shashikala as Sonia
Rajendra Nath
Tarun Bose as Shankar Choudhary 
Veena
Pratima Devi
Badri Prasad as Rai Saheb
Sulochana Chatterjee

Music
The Music of the film was composed by the maestro duo Shankar–Jaikishan.
The music of the film was one of the highlights of the film. Singers like Mohammed Rafi, Suman Kalyanpur, Asha Bhosle & Lata Mangeshkar lent their voices for the album. The music album was produced by producer Uttam Kumar. The album was a big hit as was the film.

Notes

References

External links
 
 Chhoti Si Mulaqat on YouTube

1960s Hindi-language films
Films scored by Shankar–Jaikishan
Hindi remakes of Bengali films
Films based on Indian novels
Films based on works by Ashapurna Devi